Manuel Lama Maroto (born 12 February 2001) is a Spanish footballer who plays as a defender for Atlético Madrid.

Career

Lama started his career with Spanish La Liga side Atlético Madrid. In 2020, he was sent on loan to La Nucía in the Spanish third tier.

Personal life
Lama is the son of Spanish sportscaster Manolo Lama.

References

External links
 
 

2001 births
Living people
Footballers from Madrid
Spanish footballers
Association football defenders
Atlético Madrid B players
CF La Nucía players
CF Fuenlabrada footballers
Primera Federación players
Segunda División B players
Segunda Federación players
Tercera Federación players